Averky Borisovich Aristov (4 November 1903 – 11 July 1973) was a Soviet politician and diplomat.

Biography 
Born at Krasny Yar in Astrakhan Governorate, he was the son of a fisherman, working for a fishery during 1912 - 1919. In 1919 he joined the Komsomol and 1921 he became a member of the Russian Communist Party (b). He was a member of the Politburo of the CPSU Central Committee from 1952 until 1953 and from 1957 until 1961. Dismissed from the Politburo in 1961, he became ambassador to Poland (1961–1971) and to Austria (1971–1973).

He was buried at the Novodevichy Cemetery, Moscow.

See also
Politics of the Soviet Union

References 
 Michel Tatu: Macht und Ohnmacht im Kreml, Edition Grasset and Ullstein, 1967 and 1968, Paris and Frankfurt/M
 Merle Fainsod: Wie Russland regiert wird; Kiepenheuer & Witsch, 1965
 Wolfgang Leonhard: Chruschtschows große Säuberung in der Welt v. 24. 02. 1961 via Blinken Open Society Archives

1903 births
1973 deaths
People from Astrakhan Oblast
People from Astrakhan Governorate
Bolsheviks
Politburo of the Central Committee of the Communist Party of the Soviet Union members
Members of the Supreme Soviet of the Soviet Union
Ambassadors of the Soviet Union to Austria
Ambassadors of the Soviet Union to Poland
Recipients of the Order of Lenin
Recipients of the Order of the Red Banner of Labour
Recipients of the Order of the Red Star
Burials at Novodevichy Cemetery